Hope Township is located in LaSalle County, Illinois. As of the 2010 census, its population was 689 and it contained 299 housing units.

Geography

Demographics

References

External links
 US Census
 City-data.com
 Illinois State Archives

Townships in LaSalle County, Illinois
Populated places established in 1849
Townships in Illinois
1849 establishments in Illinois